The Sean Hannity Show is a conservative talk radio show hosted by Sean Hannity. The program is broadcast live every weekday, from 3 p.m. to 6 p.m. ET. The show is produced in the New York City studios of radio station WOR and is sometimes transmitted via ISDN from Hannity's home in Centre Island, New York.  The show is now syndicated by Premiere Networks, a subsidiary of iHeartMedia, on terrestrial radio affiliates across the United States, on Sirius XM Patriot channel 125. and on American Forces Network's AFN 360 PowerTalk and The Voice channels. The primary focus of the program is the politics of the day, with interviews of liberal and conservative commentators. After conservative radio show The Rush Limbaugh Show ended its run following Limbaugh's 2021 death, The Sean Hannity Show became the most-listened to commercial radio talk show with millions of listeners.''Syndication

Syndication began through the ABC Radio Networks on September 10, 2001, one day before the September 11 attacks. The program is carried on WSB in Atlanta, Georgia (second and third hours delayed three hours), KFYI in Phoenix, Arizona, WOKV in Jacksonville, Florida, WDTK in Detroit, WCBM in Baltimore, Maryland and WKRC in Cincinnati, Ohio, among others. The show is carried in most markets by a Citadel Broadcasting radio station; the show is owned by Citadel Broadcasting, which acquired the ABC Radio networks in 2006. 

Hannity's first version of his radio show was in the late 1980s as a volunteer broadcaster for the University of California, Santa Barbara's radio station, KCSB-FM. He was dismissed from the station in 1989, following a controversial interview about AIDS in which he insulted a lesbian caller. Later, Hannity would bring his program to WVNN in Athens, Alabama and NewsRadio WGST in Atlanta, Georgia.

Hannity is the highest rated talk program on many stations. The show is carried on 530 stations.  He is a three-time consecutive winner of Radio & Records National Talk Show Host of The Year Award from 2003-2005. In 2004, Hannity signed a US$25 million, five-year contract extension with ABC Radio to continue the show through 2009; however, ABC Radio's acquisition by Citadel Broadcasting on June 12, 2007 gave Hannity an opportunity to leave one year after the acquisition. 

In July 2008, it was announced that Hannity's show would be co-managed by Citadel's ABC Radio Networks and Premiere Radio Networks, a division of Clear Channel Communications. Premiere Radio would handle advertising sales and distribution to all non-Citadel owned stations, including Clear Channel-owned stations. Hannity already had agreements with approximately 80 Clear Channel stations in a separate agreement. The two networks would cooperate for special circumstances.

Radio show
The show primarily features a mixture of monologues, conversations with callers, and interviews with those in the news.

Content
Hannity's frequent political targets include terrorism, illegal immigration, weapon of mass destruction in Iraq,
and the Emergency Economic Stabilization Act of 2008. He frequently characterizes American liberalism as a movement more in line with democratic socialism than classical liberalism.

The show frequently features "man on the street" interviews (Man On The Street Thursday), where New York pedestrians are stopped and questioned about politics. Hannity will sometimes debate the answers with participants.

The show also features the occasional inclusion of behind the scenes staff, including producers Elisha, Lynda, "Sweet Baby" James, and animal-rights proponent "Flipper". "Gregster" is the engineer who typically plays the audio clips.

The show used to close daily with the segment "Trash the Lines" where calls were taken unscreened, with callers given approximately five seconds to say whatever they wanted. The segment, which had its roots in a late-night show Hannity hosted earlier in his career, has been used less frequently since the summer of 2006.

Following the election victory of Democrat Barack Obama, Hannity has hyperbolically referred to his show as "conservatism in exile", "the conservative resistance," "the conservative underground."

Opening themes
Each hour of The Sean Hannity Show used to open with the following musical pieces, in order:

1. The introduction (iterated twice) spliced with the second singing of the refrain of "Independence Day" performed by Martina McBride.

2. Carmina Burana (Orff), over which announcer Scott Shannon traditionally proclaimed, "From coast to coast, from border to border, from sea to shining sea, Sean Hannity is on!" The quote usually spilled over into the opening riff of "Eye of the Tiger" by Survivor and Carmina Burana is also used in "Glory" & "Jackass: The Movie".

However, neither Carmina Burana nor Shannon's traditional voiceover is now in use. The show has frequently changed its opening voiceover to reflect current events.

3. The instrumental opening to "The Way It Is" performed by Bruce Hornsby and the Range, over which Hannity begins speaking. This has not been used in recent broadcasts.

Occasionally on the third hour, "Eye of the Tiger" by Survivor would replace both Carmina Burana and "The Way It Is", with Shannon announcing, "Overlooking Madison Square Garden, deep in the heart of midtown Manhattan, the last beacon of truth in a troubled time! This is The Sean Hannity Show and the world-famous Final Hour Free-for-All!"

Sometimes during election years, an additional announcement was made after Carmina Burana, proclaiming the edition to be "a special edition of The Sean Hannity Show: The Battle for America," featuring a countdown until Election Day. On Election Day 2007 (November 6, 2007), the "special edition" message counted down the days that remained until the 2008 Iowa Caucus (January 3, 2008), "Super Tuesday" (February 5, 2008), and Election Day (November 4, 2008).

In mid-2014, "Independence Day" was retired and replaced by "This Is How We Roll" by Florida Georgia Line as the show's theme song.

As of November 2020, the show's opening sequence is:
 The beginning of "Comin' to Your City" by Big & Rich until the end of the first chorus
 A variety of quotes (which change every other day, depending on current events) by various political figures
 Scott Shannon announcing, "Freedom is back in style. Welcome to the revolution."
 The lines "Yeah, we're coming to your city / gonna play our guitars and sing you a country song" from "Comin' to Your City"
 Shannon again, saying, "Sean Hannity, the new Sean Hannity Show. More behind-the-scenes information on breaking news and more bold inspiring solutions for America!"
 Prior to the third hour, Shannon adds, "Stay tuned for our final news roundup and information overload."

The "Hate-Hannity Hotline"
Hannity provides a phone line for people who disagree with him to call in. He plays some of these clips at the beginning of the bottom half-hour segment of the show. He usually supplements these clips with the explanation that he is performing a service to the American people by "Absorbing the hate and bitterness of the angry left so that they will be nicer to you when you meet them along your way."  This has appeared with less frequency in the radio show, though on the revamped Hannity on the Fox News Channel, this has become a regular segment (usually airing on Thursday).

Guest hosts
WABC personality Mark Levin frequently filled in for Hannity during the host's absence until Levin obtained his own syndicated program. Guest hosts have included Barry Farber, Mike Gallagher, Curtis Sliwa, Kirby Wilbur, Dennis Miller, and Mark Simone.

Guests on his show
The frequent guests on his radio show included John McCain, Rudy Giuliani, Mike Huckabee, Newt Gingrich, Mitt Romney, Bobby Jindal, Fred Thompson and other politicians from both sides of the political aisle.

Book club
The Hannity show also has a book club with author interviews and discussions on topics. More recent books have included Strategery by Bill Sammon and Fight Back by G. Gordon Liddy. Hannity has also authored three New York Times bestsellers on politics and current events.

Show website
Hannity's website offers subscribers to the "Hannity Insider" subscription service live and recorded streaming audio of the program, available for download to an iPod or other MP3 player. In addition, the program was added to the Armed Forces Radio Network in December 2005. Audio streams of The Sean Hannity Show average more than 190,000 subscribed listeners per month. There is also Hannidate, a chat room for conservative singles, both heterosexual and gay. The website also includes a forum to discuss political topics. Respectful conversation and debate is encouraged.

See also
Alan ColmesHannityHannity & Colmes Hannity's America''

References

External links
 
 Show ratings via Talkers Magazine
 Hannity program added to Armed Forces radio
 Profile of host Hannity

Conservative talk radio
Sean Hannity
Sirius XM Radio programs